Hazel Hotchkiss Wightman defeated Marion Zinderstein 6–1, 6–2 in the final to win the women's singles tennis title at the 1919 U.S. National Championships. The event was played on outdoor grass courts and held at the Philadelphia Cricket Club in Chestnut Hill, Philadelphia in the United States from June 16 through June 21, 1919. It was the first edition of the event without a challenge round. The final began in fine weather  at 2:15 pm on Saturday, June 21, 1920, and lasted  minutes. It was Hazel Wightman's fourth national singles title after 1909, 1910 and 1911.

Draw

Final eight

References

1919
1919 in women's tennis
1919 in American women's sports
Women's Singles
Chestnut Hill, Philadelphia
1910s in Philadelphia
1919 in sports in Pennsylvania
Women's sports in Pennsylvania